William Henry Orchard  (9 August 1888 – 22 July 1965) was an Australian rules football player for the Geelong Football Club between 1906 and 1915. He served in the First AIF. He was awarded a Military Cross.

Family
The son of Edwin Orchard (1863-1927) and Ruth Orchard (1866-1938), née Mallett, he was born on 9 August 1888. He married Henrietta Jessie Galbraith (1895-1966) on 21 July 1915; they had three children, William, Douglas, and June.

Football

Geelong (VFL)
He was Geelong's captained for two seasons: 1914 and 1915. He was also playing coach in 1914.

Third Divisional team (AIF)
He played for the (winning) Third Australian Divisional team in the famous "Pioneer Exhibition Game" of Australian Rules football, held in London, in October 1916. A news film was taken at the match.

Field Umpire
He was a field umpire in the Victorian Football League (VFL) during the 1920s.

Cricket
Orchard was an outstanding cricketer taking 264 wickets at 12.6 between 1903–1936 in the Geelong Cricket Association.

Military career
In  1918 at Ypres he was awarded the Military Cross for "the efficient manner in which he (Captain Orchard) carried out his task of reorganisation and his cheerfulness under depressing circumstances that earned for him the Military Cross."

See also
 1916 Pioneer Exhibition Game

Footnotes

References
 Studio portrait: Captain William Henry Orchard, M.C., collection of the  Australian War Memorial.
 Pioneer Exhibition Game Australian Football: in aid of British and French Red Cross Societies: 3rd Australian Division v. Australian Training Units at Queen's Club, West Kensington, on Saturday, October 28th, 1916, at 3pm, Wightman & Co., (London), 1919.
 First World War Embarkation Roll: Lieutenant William Henry Orchard, collection of the Australian War Memorial.
 First World War Nominal Roll: Captain William Henry Orchard (MC), collection of the Australian War Memorial.
 Honours and Awards (Military Cross): Captain William Henry Orchard, collection of the Australian War Memorial.
 First World War Service Record: Captain William Henry Orchard (MC), National Archives of Australia.
 Richardson, N. (2016), The Game of Their Lives, Pan Macmillan Australia: Sydney.

External links

 Boyles Football Photos: Billy Orchard.
 Player Biography: Billy Orchard, ''AustralianFootball.com".

1888 births
1965 deaths
People educated at Geelong Grammar School
Australian rules footballers from Geelong
Australian Rules footballers: place kick exponents
Participants in "Pioneer Exhibition Game" (London, 28 October 1916)
Geelong Football Club players
Geelong Football Club coaches
Australian Football League umpires
Australian Army officers
Australian recipients of the Military Cross
Military personnel from Victoria (Australia)